A butlerage was a duty of two shillings on every ton of wine imported into England by merchant strangers. It was so called because it was paid to the king's butler for the king.  The tax was levied from 1302 to 1809.

References

Further reading
Webster's Revised Unabridged Dictionary (1913)

History of taxation in the United Kingdom
History of wine